Immunofluorescence is a technique used for light microscopy with a fluorescence microscope and is used primarily on biological samples. This technique uses the specificity of antibodies to their antigen to target fluorescent dyes to specific biomolecule targets within a cell, and therefore allows visualization of the distribution of the target molecule through the sample. The specific region an antibody recognizes on an antigen is called an epitope. There have been efforts in epitope mapping since many antibodies can bind the same epitope and levels of binding between antibodies that recognize the same epitope can vary. Additionally, the binding of the fluorophore to the antibody itself cannot interfere with the immunological specificity of the antibody or the binding capacity of its antigen. Immunofluorescence is a widely used example of immunostaining (using antibodies to stain proteins) and is a specific example of immunohistochemistry (the use of the antibody-antigen relationship in tissues). This technique primarily makes use of fluorophores to visualise the location of the antibodies.

Immunofluorescence can be used on tissue sections, cultured cell lines, or individual cells, and may be used to analyze the distribution of proteins, glycans, and small biological and non-biological molecules. This technique can even be used to visualize structures such as intermediate-sized filaments. If the topology of a cell membrane has yet to be determined, epitope insertion into proteins can be used in conjunction with immunofluorescence to determine structures. Immunofluorescence can also be used as a "semi-quantitative" method to gain insight into the levels and localization patterns of DNA methylation since it is a more time-consuming method than true quantitative methods and there is some subjectivity in the analysis of the levels of methylation. Immunofluorescence can be used in combination with other, non-antibody methods of fluorescent staining, for example, use of DAPI to label DNA. Several microscope designs can be used for analysis of immunofluorescence samples; the simplest is the epifluorescence microscope, and the confocal microscope is also widely used. Various super-resolution microscope designs that are capable of much higher resolution can also be used.

Types

Preparation of fluorescence 
To make fluorochrome-labeled antibodies, a fluorochrome must be conjugated ("tagged") to the antibody. Likewise, an antigen can also be conjugated to the antibody with a fluorescent probe in a technique called fluorescent antigen technique. Staining procedures can apply to both fixed antigen in the cytoplasm or to cell surface antigens on living cells, called "membrane immunofluorescence". It is also possible to label the complement of the antibody-antigen complex with a fluorescent probe.  In addition to the element to which fluorescence probes are attached, there are two general classes of immunofluorescence techniques: primary and secondary. The following descriptions will focus primarily on these classes in terms of conjugated antibodies.

There are two classes of immunofluorescence techniques, primary (or direct) and secondary (or indirect).

Primary (direct)
Primary (direct) immunofluorescence uses a single, primary antibody, chemically linked to a fluorophore. The primary antibody recognizes the target molecule (antigen) and binds to a specific region called the epitope. This is accomplished by a process which manipulates the immune response of organism with adaptive immunity. The attached fluorophore can be detected via fluorescent microscopy, which, depending on the messenger used, will emit a specific wavelength of light once excited. Direct immunofluorescence, although somewhat less common, has notable advantages over the secondary (indirect) procedure. The direct attachment of the messenger to the antibody reduces the number of steps in the procedure, saving time and reducing non-specific background signal. This also limits the possibility of antibody cross-reactivity and possible mistakes throughout the process. However, some disadvantages do exist in this method. Since the number of fluorescent molecules that can be bound to the primary antibody is limited, direct immunofluorescence is substantially less sensitive than indirect immunofluorescence and may result in false negatives. Direct immunofluorescence also requires the use of much more primary antibody, which is extremely expensive, sometimes running up to $400.00/mL.

Secondary (indirect)

Secondary (indirect) immunofluorescence uses two antibodies; the unlabeled first  (primary) antibody specifically binds the target molecule, and the secondary antibody, which carries the fluorophore, recognizes the primary antibody and binds to it.  Multiple secondary antibodies can bind a single primary antibody.  This provides signal amplification by increasing the number of fluorophore molecules per antigen. This protocol is more complex and time-consuming than the primary (or direct) protocol above, but allows more flexibility because a variety of different secondary antibodies and detection techniques can be used for a given primary antibody.

This protocol is possible because an antibody consists of two parts, a variable region (which recognizes the antigen) and constant region (which makes up the structure of the antibody molecule). It is important to realize that this division is artificial and in reality the antibody molecule is four polypeptide chains: two heavy chains and two light chains. A researcher can generate several primary antibodies that recognize various antigens (have different variable regions), but all share the same constant region. All these antibodies may therefore be recognized by a single secondary antibody. This saves the cost of modifying the primary antibodies to directly carry a fluorophore.

Different primary antibodies with different constant regions are typically generated by raising the antibody in different species. For example, a researcher might create primary antibodies in a goat that recognize several antigens, and then employ dye-coupled rabbit secondary antibodies that recognize the goat antibody constant region ("rabbit anti-goat" antibodies). The researcher may then create a second set of primary antibodies in a mouse that could be recognized by a separate "donkey anti-mouse" secondary antibody. This allows re-use of the difficult-to-make dye-coupled antibodies in multiple experiments.

Limitations
As with most fluorescence techniques, a significant problem with immunofluorescence is photobleaching.  Loss of activity caused by photobleaching can be controlled by reducing or limiting the intensity or time-span of light exposure, by increasing the concentration of fluorophores, or by employing more robust fluorophores that are less prone to bleaching (e.g., Alexa Fluors, Seta Fluors, or DyLight Fluors). Some problems that may arise from this technique include autofluorescence, extraneous undesired specific fluorescence, and nonspecific fluorescence. Autofluorescence includes fluorescence emitted from the sample tissue or cell itself. Extraneous undesired specific fluorescence occurs when a targeted antigen is impure and contains antigenic contaminants. Nonspecific fluorescence involves the loss of a probe's specificity due to fluorophore, from improper fixation, or from a dried out specimen.

Immunofluorescence is only limited to fixed (i.e., dead) cells when structures within the cell are to be visualized because antibodies do not penetrate the cell membrane when reacting with fluorescent labels. Antigenic material must be fixed firmly on the site of its natural localization inside the cell. Intact antibodies can also be too large to dye cancer cells in vivo. Their size results in slow tumor penetration and long circulating half-life. Research has been done investigating the use of diabodies to get around this limitation. Proteins in the supernatant or on the outside of the cell membrane can be bound by the antibodies; this allows for living cells to be stained. Depending on the fixative that is being used, proteins of interest might become cross-linked and this could result in either false positive or false negative signals due to non-specific binding.

An alternative approach is using recombinant proteins containing fluorescent protein domains, e.g., green fluorescent protein (GFP). Use of such "tagged" proteins allows determination of their localization in live cells. Even though this seems to be an elegant alternative to immunofluorescence, the cells have to be transfected or transduced with the GFP-tag, and as a consequence they become at least S1 or above organisms that require stricter security standards in a laboratory. This technique involves altering the genetic information of cells.

Advances 
Many improvements to this method lie in the improvement of fluorescent microscopes and fluorophores. Super-resolution methods generally refer to a microscope's ability to produce resolution below the Abbe limit (a limit placed on light due to its wavelength). This diffraction limit is about 200-300 nm in the lateral direction and 500-700 nm in the axial direction. This limit is comparable or larger than some structures in the cell, and consequently, this limit prevented scientists from determining details in their structure. Super-resolution in fluorescence, more specifically, refers to the ability of a microscope to prevent the simultaneous fluorescence of adjacent spectrally identical fluorophores. This process effectively sharpens the point-spread function of the microscope. Examples of recently developed super-resolution fluorescent microscope methods include stimulated emission depletion (STED) microscopy, saturated structured-illumination microscopy (SSIM), fluorescence photoactivation localization microscopy (FPALM), and stochastic optical reconstruction microscopy (STORM).

Notable people 
 

Cornelia Mitchell Downs (1892–1987), microbiologist and journalist

See also 
 Cutaneous conditions with immunofluorescence findings
 Immunochemistry
 Patching and Capping

References

External links 
 Images associated with autoimmune diseases at University of Birmingham
 Overview at Davidson College
 

Immunologic tests
Biological techniques and tools
Pathology
Anatomical pathology
Life sciences industry
Reagents for biochemistry